This article details the Leeds Rhinos rugby league football club's 2016 season. This was the Leeds Rhinos' 21st season in the Super League. Leeds Rhinos were the reigning winners of the Super League Grand Final, Super League Leaders' Shield and the Challenge Cup, after they became only the third team in the Super League era to win the treble in 2015.

Leeds Rhinos finished in 9th position after 23 rounds, their lowest finish since 1996, before demotion to The Qualifiers. Leeds Rhinos then finished 1st in The Qualifiers, winning six of their seven matches, to maintain their Super League status for the 2017 season.

Players

 Appearances and points include (Super League, Challenge Cup and Qualifiers) as of 22 September 2016.

Transfers

In

Out

Competitions

Super League

Table

* = Salford Red Devils were penalized six points for a salary cap infringement during the 2014 and 2015 seasons.

Results

Qualifiers

Challenge Cup

World Club Challenge

References

External links
Leeds Rhinos Website
Leeds Rhinos - SL Website

Leeds Rhinos seasons
Super League XXI by club
Rugby